To Olivia (formerly titled An Unquiet Life) is a 2021 British drama film directed by John Hay and starring Hugh Bonneville as Roald Dahl and Keeley Hawes as Patricia Neal.  It is based on Stephen Michael Shearer's biography about Neal titled An Unquiet Life.  The film features Geoffrey Palmer in his final film appearance.

To Olivia was released in the United Kingdom via Sky Cinema on 19 February 2021.

Plot
The film covers Dahl and Neal's marriage as they grapple with the loss of their daughter, Olivia, from encephalitis due to measles.

Cast
 Hugh Bonneville as Roald Dahl
 Keeley Hawes as Patricia Neal
 Sam Heughan as Paul Newman
 Geoffrey Palmer as Geoffrey Fisher
 Conleth Hill as Martin Ritt

Production

Casting
Bonneville was cast as Dahl in May 2017.  Hawes was cast as Neal in November 2019.  Heughan was cast as Paul Newman in December 2019.

Filming
Principal photography began in Surrey on November 14, 2019.

Palmer died in November 2020, but had completed all his scheduled scenes before this time.

Release
The film was released in the United Kingdom via Sky Cinema on 19 February 2021.

In February 2022, it was announced that Vertical Entertainment acquired North American distribution rights to the film, which was released in the United States on April 15, 2022.

Reception
The film has a 58% rating on Rotten Tomatoes. Peter Bradshaw of The Guardian gave the film two out of five stars, complimenting the performances but finding it too reverential and safe. Clarisse Loughrey of The Independent gave it three out of five stars, criticizing its portrayal of Dahl and stating, 'It struggles to reconcile the palpable image of a sensitive family man laid low by depression with the more complicated reality that ran alongside it – that of a sometimes-tyrant with a great capacity for manipulation.'

References

External links
 

2021 films
2021 drama films
British biographical drama films
Films based on biographies
Icon Productions films
2020s English-language films
2020s British films